Tyler Christian Soderstrom (born November 24, 2001) is an American professional baseball catcher in the Oakland Athletics organization. He was selected 26th overall by the Athletics in the 2020 MLB draft.

Amateur career
Soderstrom attended Turlock High School in Turlock, California, where he played baseball. In 2019, his junior year, he hit .450 with four home runs. That summer, he played in the 2019 Under Armour All-America Baseball Game. He also played for the 18U United States national baseball team, hitting .364. As a senior in 2020, he was named the Gatorade California Baseball Player of the Year after batting .357 over five games before the season was cut short due to the COVID-19 pandemic. He signed to play college baseball at UCLA.

Professional career
Soderstrom was considered one of the top prospects for the 2020 Major League Baseball draft. He was selected 26th overall by the Oakland Athletics, and signed with them for $3.3 million. He did not play a minor league game in 2020 due to the cancellation of the minor league season caused by the pandemic. To begin the 2021 season, he was assigned to the Stockton Ports of the Low-A West. In June, Soderstrom was selected to play in the All-Star Futures Game at Coors Field. After not playing in a game since July 23, he was placed on the injured list on August 16 with a back injury and missed the remainder of the season. Over 57 games with Stockton, Soderstrom slashed .306/.390/.568 with 12 home runs, 49 RBIs, and twenty doubles.

Soderstrom was assigned to the Lansing Lugnuts of the High-A Midwest League to begin the 2022 season. In early August, he was promoted to the Midland RockHounds of the Double-A Texas League. Near the season's end, he was promoted to the Las Vegas Aviators of the Triple-A Pacific Coast League. Over 134 games between the three teams, he slashed .267/.324/.501 with 29 home runs and 105 RBIs.

Personal
Soderstrom's father, Steve Soderstrom, was selected sixth overall by the San Francisco Giants in the 1993 Major League Baseball draft.

References

External links

2001 births
Living people
Baseball catchers
Baseball players from California
People from Turlock, California
United States national baseball team players
Stockton Ports players